Data Management API (DMAPI) is the interface defined in the X/Open document "Systems Management: Data Storage Management (XDSM) API" dated February 1997. XFS, IBM JFS, VxFS, AdvFS, StorNext and IBM Spectrum Scale file systems support DMAPI for Hierarchical Storage Management (HSM).

External links 
 Systems Management: Data Storage Management (XDSM) API
Overview of IBM Spectrum Scale Data Management API
 Open Source XFS Source code with DMAPI Implementation and Test Suite 

Data management